Concón is a Chilean city and commune in Valparaíso Province, Valparaíso Region. It is a major tourist center known for its beaches, balnearios (beachside resorts) and night life.

Geography 
It is located on the Pacific coast north of Reñaca, Viña del Mar and south of Quintero. The Aconcagua river ends at the north of the town.

Its three main beaches are Playa Negra, Amarilla and Boca. 50 hectares of dunes stretch along and above the coast, though only about 20 are protected, the rest being increasingly encroached by highrise apartment buildings.

Demographics 
According to data from the 2002 Census of Population and Housing, the commune of Concón had 32,273 inhabitants; of these, 31,558 (97.8%) lived in urban areas and 715 (2.2%) in rural areas. At that time, there were 15,713 men and 16,560 women. Since then, the city has been one of the fastest growing in the country, The population grew by 71% (13,401 persons) between the 1992 and 2002 censuses. The 2010 population was more than 50,000.

The demonym for a person from Concón is Conconino for a man, or Conconina for a woman.

History 
This location was first mentioned by Pedro de Valdivia in 1541. It was created as a municipality in 1899 but became part of Viña del Mar in 1927. A 1995 law again turned it into its own municipality.

Administration
As a commune, Concón administered by a municipal council, which is headed by a directly elected alcalde. The current mayor is Oscar Sumonte González. The municipal council has the following members:
Jorge Valdovinos Gómez, Maria José Aguirre Neuenschwander, Rodolfo Moya Spuler, Marcial Ortiz Flores, Gabriela Orfali Abud y Adriana Marinetti García.

Within the electoral divisions of Chile, Concón is represented in the Chamber of Deputies by Edmundo Eluchans (UDI) and Rodrigo González as part of the 14th electoral district, together with Viña del Mar. The commune is represented in the Senate by Francisco Chahuán Chahuán (RN) and Ricardo Lagos Weber (PPD) as part of the 6th senatorial constituency (Valparaíso-Coast).

References

External links
  Municipality of Concón

Populated places in Valparaíso Province
Port cities in Chile
Communes of Chile
Populated places established in 1995
1899 establishments in Chile
Coasts of Valparaíso Region
Concón